The men's shot put competition of the athletics events at the 2019 Pan American Games will take place on the 7 of August at the 2019 Pan American Games Athletics Stadium. The defending Pan American Games champion is O'Dayne Richards from Jamaica.

Records
Prior to this competition, the existing world and Pan American Games records were as follows:

Schedule

Results
All distances shown are in meters.

Final
The results were as follows:

References

Athletics at the 2019 Pan American Games
2019